HRL may refer to:
 HRL (software), an artificial intelligence program
 HRL Laboratories, formerly Hughes Research Laboratories, in Malibu, California, United States
 Harlech railway station, in Wales
 Hilandar Research Library, at Ohio State University
 IBM Haifa Research Laboratory, in Haifa, Israel
 Valley International Airport, serving Harlingen, Texas, United States